Mark Bunker, (born May 23, 1956) is an American politician, broadcast journalist, videographer and documentary filmmaker. He won a Regional Emmy Award in 2006 from the Pacific Southwest Emmy Awards division of the National Academy of Television Arts and Sciences.  He is the city councilman for Clearwater Florida's 2nd district.

He is a critic of the Church of Scientology, having previously worked for Bob Minton and the Lisa McPherson Trust, and is the founder of Xenu TV, a website featuring videos and commentary critical of Scientology.

Early career
Mark Bunker worked in radio in the Midwest. In the mid-1980s, he then moved to Los Angeles to work as a theater actor and as an actor in television commercials. He also worked for a company doing market research for Hollywood studios, and trained as a video editor with KNBC.

Broadcast journalism
In 2006, Bunker along with KUSI-TV reporter Lena Lewis, won an Emmy Award from the Pacific Southwest Emmy Awards division of the National Academy of Television Arts and Sciences, for a story on border issues in the San Diego, California area.

Criticism of Scientology

Bunker started Xenu TV in 1999 and moved to Clearwater, Florida, where he produced videos for the Lisa McPherson trust.

In 2001, Mark Bunker and Jeff Jacobsen, a fellow critic of the Church of Scientology, were refused service by businesses operated by Scientologists in Clearwater.  Together they filed discrimination complaints with the Pinellas County Office of Human Rights. The Office of Human Rights rejected their complaints, ruling that the church members had not broken any laws in denying them service.  Bunker, Jacobson, and other members of the Lisa McPherson Trust saw this as a sign of the escalating control the Church of Scientology held over the town.  Ray Arsenault, a University of South Florida professor and then acting president of the Pinellas chapter of the American Civil Liberties Union, also viewed the denials as acts of discrimination. "It really is a way of trying to bring pressure to stop them from exercising their First Amendment rights."

Since 2010, Bunker has been producing a feature-length independent documentary film entitled Knowledge Report: Scientology's Spies, Lies, and the Eternity Prize concerning the Church of Scientology. According to Bunker, the planned release date is May 2016. This film is being funded by Bunker himself and through crowdfunding.

Project Chanology

In 2008, Bunker posted a video to YouTube critical of the Internet-based group "Anonymous" and asked them to tone down their campaign against the Church of Scientology; a movement called "Project Chanology". In the video "Message to Anonymous", Bunker urged the group to work legally and pursue peaceful ways to protest Scientology.

According to NPR's Morning Edition, Bunker has "become a revered voice to many members of Anonymous", and they refer to him as "Wise Beard Man". Anonymous has adopted a slogan referring to Bunker: "Wise Beard Man. His words are wise, his face is beard." The refrain along with a picture of Bunker has become an Internet meme on the website 4chan.

When actor Jason Beghe decided to leave Scientology in 2008, he contacted Andreas Heldal-Lund, founder of Operation Clambake, who convinced him to meet with Bunker. Heldal-Lund and Bunker went to Beghe's house, where Beghe participated in an interview about his experiences as a Scientologist. Bunker published a 3-minute portion of the 3-hour interview to YouTube in mid-April 2008, and in the video Beghe calls Scientology "very dangerous for your spiritual, psychological, mental, emotional health and evolution". He also comments "I don't have an agenda. I'm just trying to help. I have the luxury of having gotten into Scientology and after having been in it, been out. And that's a perspective that people who are still in and not out do not have."

The video was taken down from YouTube on April 17, 2008, but was reposted by multiple other YouTube users shortly thereafter. By April 18, 2008, at least 45 users had reposted the video interview using their own YouTube accounts. Bunker's account was also canceled on April 17, and he believes this was due to copyright issues with a clip from The Colbert Report that he had uploaded. Bunker said that those issues had been resolved, and that YouTube should have given him time to prove that before pulling the Jason Beghe interview. Bunker believes that YouTube removed the Beghe interview after receiving pressure from Scientology. A representative for YouTube told Fox News "There’s no conspiracy here.", but would not say whether Scientology pressured YouTube to remove the video, saying: "We do not comment on individual videos."

On February 24, 2009, Bunker was arrested while photographing the arrest of another individual who was protesting against Scientology outside of the organization's Gold Base compound near Hemet, California. The protester was also arrested, after Scientology officials had made a citizen's arrest. Bunker stated that five protesters had previously walked in front of the Scientology property, and crossed its driveway. Police allege that the two individuals arrested were blocking the entrance to the facility, but according to The Press-Enterprise: "protesters say they were neither trespassing nor blocking the entryway". A protester was arrested, and Bunker said that while he was photographing police deputies arrest the individual, he was arrested as well. The protesters were released the same day, and the Riverside County District Attorney dropped the case because of insufficient evidence.

Clearwater City Council Run 
On June 21, 2019, Bunker announced that he would be running for Clearwater City Council in the March 2020 election.  Among his campaign issues were demanding accountability and openness from the leaders of the Church of Scientology.  His campaign was endorsed by Scientology and the Aftermath hosts Leah Remini and Mike Rinder.  On March 17, 2020, Bunker was elected to the Clearwater City Council.

Personal life 

Bunker was born on May 23, 1956, in Oshkosh, Wisconsin.

Awards

References

External links

Living people
Critics of Scientology
American male journalists
American television producers
Regional Emmy Award winners
Scientology and the Internet
Articles containing video clips
American male non-fiction writers
1956 births